Euromed is a high-speed rail service operated by Renfe along the Spanish Mediterranean coast.

Service

Euromed entered commercial service on June 16, 1997, along a  Mediterranean corridor, between the cities of Barcelona, Tarragona, Castellón de la Plana, Valencia and Alicante. As of January 2020 the Euromed service connects the city of Barcelona to the city of Valencia in 2 hours and 35 minutes and Barcelona to Alicante in 4 hours and 20 minutes.

 Barcelona Sants railway station
 Camp de Tarragona railway station
 Castellón de la Plana railway station
 Valencia-Joaquín Sorolla railway station
 Alicante railway station

The line uses parts of the Madrid–Levante high-speed rail network, further construction works between Valencia and Alicante for the increase of speed and connectivity are ongoing as of 2021 as not all sections are capable for 200 km/h and above.

Rolling stock
The service started using series 101 EMU rolling stock with bogies adapted for use on  the  Iberian gauge track. Traction current is supplied by overhead lines, at either 3,000 volts direct current, or 25,000 volts alternating current at 50 Hz. The fleet of six units was built by the French multinational Alstom. 

In 2009 all the TGV based rolling stock was converted to standard gauge and replaced by the new RENFE Class 130.

Accidents and incidents 
 On 30 March 2002 a Euromed train traveling across points at  collided with a local train in Tarragona that had just left Torredembarra station. The impact caused both trains to derail, two fatalities, and 90 injured.

References

External links 
Euromed at official RENFE website 
Alaris, Euromed, Altaria 

Renfe high-speed trains
High-speed rail in Spain